The CSJ Awards are an annual event organised by the Centre for Social Justice, a centre right British political thinktank, where grants are awarded to organisations working in the field of poverty relief. In 2009, a Channel 4 documentary series was made by filmmaker and TV presenter Sadie Kaye about the award nominees which also featured interviews with the Rt. Hon. Iain Duncan Smith and awards host Esther Rantzen.

2006 Awards

The 2006 award ceremony will be held on the 28 June 2006 at Central Hall in Westminster, London. Grants totalling £25,000 will be given to a number of the 12 short-listed charities nominated this year. All short-listed charities will also be invited to join the CSJ Alliance, a grouping of charities who work in similar fields and wish to cooperate with each other.

2005 Awards

The following organisations won grants at the 2005 awards ceremony:

 ADAS UK (£5000) - providing abstinence-based addiction rehabilitation in Stockport
 Bristol Community Family Trust (£3000) - engaged in relationship education and parenting classes
 Eden Failsworth - a Christian youth project in a deprived area of Manchester
 Emmaus UK (£1000) - supporting ten communities throughout Britain helping former homeless people
 Protest 4 (£3000) - campaign against people-trafficking

A local authority award (no money) was also made to Salford City Council for its highly developed relationship with voluntary groups as part of its efforts to tackle poverty.

External links
Details about the 2006 CSJ Awards
 ADAS UK
 Bristol Community Family Trust
 Emmaus UK
 Protest 4

Poverty-related organizations
British awards
Politics awards
Social justice organizations